Senator Pond may refer to:

Francis Bates Pond (1825–1883), Ohio State Senate
Levi E. Pond (1833–1895), Wisconsin State Senate
Preston Pond Jr. (1823–1864), Louisiana State Senate

See also
Senator Pound (disambiguation)